Osmond is a city in Pierce County, Nebraska, United States. It is part of the Norfolk, Nebraska Micropolitan Statistical Area. The population was 791 at the 2020 census.

History
Osmond was established in 1890 when the Chicago, Burlington and Quincy Railroad was extended to that point. It was likely named for a railroad official.

Geography
Osmond is located at  (42.359300, -97.597699).

Demographics

2010 census
At the 2010 census there were 783 people in 319 households, including 215 families, in the city. The racial makup of the city was 97.8% White, 0.3% African American, 0.3% Asian, 0.5% from other races, and 1.1% from two or more races. Hispanic or Latino of any race were 1.8%.

Of the 319 households 31.7% had children under the age of 18 living with them, 58.0% were married couples living together, 6.6% had a female householder with no husband present, 2.8% had a male householder with no wife present, and 32.6% were non-families. 29.5% of households were one person and 16.6% were one person aged 65 or older. The average household size was 2.40 and the average family size was 2.94.

The median age was 43.1 years. 26.7% of residents were under the age of 18; 4.5% were between the ages of 18 and 24; 21.1% were from 25 to 44; 24.5% were from 45 to 64; and 23.2% were 65 or older. The gender makeup of the city was 47.3% male and 52.7% female.

2000 census
At the 2000 census there were 796 people in 340 households, including 218 families, in the city. The population density was 1,133.4 people per square mile (439.1/km). There were 370 housing units at an average density of 526.8 per square mile (204.1/km).  The racial makup of the city was 98.24% White, 0.13% African American, 0.25% Native American, 0.63% Asian, 0.75% from other races. Hispanic or Latino of any race were 1.26%.

Of the 340 households 28.5% had children under the age of 18 living with them, 55.3% were married couples living together, 6.5% had a female householder with no husband present, and 35.6% were non-families. 33.5% of households were one person and 21.8% were one person aged 65 or older. The average household size was 2.30 and the average family size was 2.94.

The age distribution was 25.6% under the age of 18, 4.9% from 18 to 24, 22.1% from 25 to 44, 20.4% from 45 to 64, and 27.0% 65 or older. The median age was 42 years. For every 100 females, there were 90.9 males. For every 100 females age 18 and over, there were 83.9 males.

As of 2000 the median income for a household in the city was $27,120, and the median family income  was $35,000. Males had a median income of $28,750 versus $17,981 for females. The per capita income for the city was $15,356. About 5.8% of families and 7.1% of the population were below the poverty line, including 9.0% of those under age 18 and 7.9% of those age 65 or over.

References

Cities in Nebraska
Cities in Pierce County, Nebraska
Norfolk Micropolitan Statistical Area